Clinton Okoth is a Kenyan striker currently in the ranks of Kenya's second-tier side Migori Youth. He formerly turned out for Kenyan Premier League sides Gor Mahia F.C., Wazito F.C. and Bidco United F.C.

Career
In January 2020, Clinton moved to Gor Mahia F.C. on loan from Migori Youth before crossing over to Wazito F.C. in November of the same year. In March 2021 he left for Bidco United F.C. for the rest of the season before making a return to Migori Youth for the 2021/22 National Super League season.

References

2001 births
Living people
Kenyan footballers
Gor Mahia F.C. players
Wazito F.C. players
Kenyan Premier League players